Kaziranga Tri-weekly Superfast Express is a superfast express train belonging Northeast Frontier Railway zone that runs between Guwahati the capital of Assam and Bangalore the capital of Karnataka  in India. It is currently being operated with 12509/12510 train numbers on tri-weekly basis.

Overview

The train is named after the world-famous Kaziranga National Park in Assam.

It is a very common train in this route. It runs thrice in a week and passes through important states such as Assam, West Bengal, Bihar, Odisha, Andhra Pradesh, Tamil Nadu and Karnataka. The train also passes through Pakur district of Jharkhand but it does not have the stoppage there.

The 12510/Guwahati–Sir M. Visvesvaraya Terminal Superfast Express has an average speed of 56 km/h and covers 2973 km in 52h 30m. The 12509/SMVT Bengaluru –Guwahati Superfast Express has an average speed of 55 km/h and covers the same distance in 53h 55m.

Timings 

The train departs from Platform #7 of Guwahati at 6:20 IST, every Sun, Mon and Tue and arrives at Platform #1 of Sir M. Visvesvaraya Terminal at 11:40 IST, every Tue, Wed and Thu.

From Platform #1 of SMVT  Bangalore Terminal, the train departs at 23:40 IST, every Wed, Thu and Fri and arrives at Platform #3 of Guwahati at 6:00 IST, every Sat, Sun and Mon.

Classes 

It is one of the non-Rajdhani/Humsafar/AC Expresses which consists of a large number of AC coaches. The train usually consists of a massive load of 24 standard ICF coach. Sometimes one or two High Capacity Parcel Vans are attached with it:

 2 AC Two Tier
 7 AC Three Tiers
 10 Sleeper classes
 2 General (unreserved)
 1 Pantry car
 2 Seating (Ladies/Disabled) cum Luggage Rakes.

As is customary with most other train services in India, coach composition may be amended at the discretion of Indian Railways, depending on demand.

Coach composition

Guwahati–Bangalore:

Bangalore–Guwahati:

Traction

 As the route of Northeast Frontier Railway is fully electrified, an Howrah-based WAP-4/WAP-7 locomotive hauls the train from Guwahati to 
 It again reverses at Visakhapatnam and gets a Erode / Royapuram-based WAP-7 electric locomotive for the way up to Sir M. Visvesvaraya Terminal, Bangalore .

Route & Halts
The stoppages of this train are as follows:

ASSAM (06 Stops)
 Guwahati Railway Station (Starts)  
 
 Barpeta
 
 
 

WEST BENGAL (12 Stops)
 
 
 
 
 New Jalpaiguri (Siliguri)
 
 
 
 
 Howrah (Kolkata)
 
 

BIHAR (02 Stops)
 
 

ODISHA (08 Stops)
 
 
 
 
 
 
 Balugaon
 

ANDHRA PRADESH (07 Stops)
 Palasa
 Srikakulam
 
 
 
 
 

TAMIL NADU (05 Stops)
 Tiruvottiyur
 Perambur (Chennai)
 
 
 

KARNATAKA (03 Stops)
 
   
 Sir M. Visvesvaraya Terminal, Bangalore (Ends).

Note: 
The train also passes through Sahibganj district and Pakur district of Jharkhand but it does not have any stoppage there.
Bold letters depicts Major Railway Stations.

Reversals
This train reverses its direction at;

Incidents
On 1 May 2014 at Chennai Central railway station the 2014 Chennai train bombing incident took place. Two low-intensity blasts occurred in two coaches S4 and S5 of the stationary 12509 - Guwahati–Bangalore Cantt. Superfast Express, killing one female passenger and injuring at least fourteen.

See also
Nagaon Express
Chennai–New Jalpaiguri SF Express
Dibrugarh–Tambaram Express
Thiruvananthapuram–Silchar Superfast Express
Bangalore Cantonment–Agartala Humsafar Express
Dibrugarh–Kanyakumari Vivek Express
Yesvantpur–Kamakhya AC Superfast Express

References

External links
 Guwahati–Bangalore Express

Named passenger trains of India
Express trains in India
Rail transport in Assam
Rail transport in West Bengal
Rail transport in Odisha
Rail transport in Andhra Pradesh
Rail transport in Tamil Nadu
Rail transport in Karnataka
2016 establishments in India
Transport in Guwahati
Transport in Bangalore
Railway services introduced in 2016